Super Remix is the second remix album by Italian singer Sabrina. It was released in 1990 in Italy only.

Album information
In 1990, Casablanca Records in Italy issued a unique compilation of remixes in the form of the very rare "Super Remix" album. Among the album's 8 tracks is a unique remix of "Sex", while the other remixes are available on other releases, too. The remix of "Sex" is the guitar-driven version Sabrina mimed to on several TV shows in 1989/1990. A version of "Gringo" (the 5:00 Extended Remix) is also featured, making the Super Remix album the only album to contain this track.

Track listings
"The Sexy Girl Mix for Boys & Hot Girls" – 6:39
"Doctor's Orders" (Extended Remix) – 5:02
"My Chico" (PWL Mix) – 6:10
"Sex" (Remix) – 3:58
"Like a Yo-Yo" (PWL Mix) – 6:30
"Guys And Dolls" (Extended Remix) – 5:06
"All of Me (Boy Oh Boy)" (PWL Remix) – 6:00
"Gringo" (Extended Remix) – 5:00

References

Sabrina Salerno albums
1990 remix albums